Copper gluconate is the copper salt of D-gluconic acid. It is an odorless light blue or blue-green crystal or powder which is easily soluble in water and insoluble in ethanol.

Uses 
Dietary supplement to treat copper deficiency.
Ingredient of Retsyn, which is an ingredient of Certs breath mints.
Fertilizer deficiency corrector to treat lacks of this nutrient.

Side effects 
The U.S. Institute of Medicine (IOM) sets Tolerable upper intake levels (ULs) for vitamins and minerals when evidence is sufficient. In the case of copper the adult UL is set at 10 mg/day.

Copper gluconate is sold as a dietary supplement to provide copper. The typical dose is 2.0 mg copper per day. This is one-fifth what the IOM considers a safe upper limit. Long-term intake at amounts higher than the UL may cause liver damage.

References

External links 
Copper gluconate monograph at Drugs.com

Copper(II) compounds
Dietary supplements
Coordination complexes
Gluconates